Jeff Julian may refer to:

 Jeff Julian (runner) (born 1935), New Zealand marathon runner
 Jeff Julian (golfer) (1961–2004), American golfer